Cudahy is an Irish surname, related to the name "Cuddihy" and is native to Counties Cork and Tipperary. The Irish form of this name would be written as Ó Cuidighthigh (male) or Ní Chuidighthigh (female).

Cudahy is the surname of several people:
 Edward Cudahy Jr. (1885–1966), American kidnapping victim; M. Cudahy's nephew
 John Cudahy (1887–1943), real estate developer and diplomat
 Michael Cudahy (electronics) (born 1924), entrepreneur
 Michael Cudahy (industrialist) (1841–1910), founder of Cudahy Packing Company
 Patrick Cudahy (1849–1919), industrialist
 Richard Dickson Cudahy (1926–2015), jurist

Cudahy is the name of two cities in the United States:
 Cudahy, California
 Cudahy, Wisconsin

Cudahy may also refer to:
 Cudahy Packing Company